Stephen Walker or Steven Walker may refer to:

People
 Stephen Walker (sculptor) (1927–2014), Australian artist
 Stephen Todd Walker (born 1966), American finance expert and author
 Steve Walker (born 1973), Canadian ice hockey player
 Stephen Walker (footballer) (born 2000), English footballer
 Stephen Walker (filmmaker), British filmmaker and author
 Stephen James Walker, British writer and editor
 Stephen Walker, musician in Modern English
 Steven Walker, musician in Spitfire
 Stephen Walker, broadcaster 3RRR

Characters
 Stephen Walker, a character on Criminal Minds
 Steve Walker, a character in In the Flesh